The 1939 Vanderbilt Commodores football team represented Vanderbilt University during the 1939 college football season. The Commodores were led by Ray Morrison, who served in the fifth season of his second stint, and sixth overall, as head coach. Members of the Southeastern Conference, Vanderbilt went 2–7–1 overall and 1–6 in conference play.  The Commodores played their six home games at Dudley Field in Nashville, Tennessee. On October 7, Kentucky defeated Vanderbilt. 21–13, for the 100th loss in the schools football program.

Schedule

References

Vanderbilt
Vanderbilt Commodores football seasons
Vanderbilt Commodores football